Diospyros pendula is a tree in the family Ebenaceae. The specific epithet  is from the Latin meaning "hanging down", referring to the inflorescence. Habitat is lowland mixed dipterocarp forests. D. pendula is found from Indochina to west Malesia.

References

pendula
Plants described in 1848
Trees of Myanmar
Trees of Thailand
Trees of Peninsular Malaysia
Trees of Borneo
Trees of Java